Sucheng District is one of two districts of Suqian, Jiangsu province, China.

Administrative divisions
In the present, Sucheng District has 6 subdistricts, 10 towns and 4 townships.
6 subdistricts

10 towns

4 townships

References
www.xzqh.org

External links 

County-level divisions of Jiangsu
Suqian